I Enjoy Being a Girl is an album by folk singer-songwriter, Phranc, released in 1989.

This album marked a turning point towards a more commercial radio-friendly sound for Phranc. Violent Femmes producer Victor DeLorenzo handled production duties and sales surpassed her debut album. The title track "I Enjoy Being A Girl" is a cover of a Rodgers and Hammerstein composition from the 1958 musical Flower Drum Song. The song "M-A-R-T-I-N-A" is about Martina Navratilova.

Track listing
All tracks composed by Phranc; except where indicated
 "Folksinger" – 2:05
 "I Enjoy Being a Girl" (Oscar Hammerstein, Richard Rodgers) – 3:16
 "Double Decker Bed" – 2:02
 "Bloodbath" – 2:54
 "Individuality" – 2:31
 "Rodeo Parakeet" – 3:01
 "Take Off Your Swastika" – 3:30
 "Toy Time" – 2:34
 "M-A-R-T-I-N-A" – 2:36
 "Myriam and Esther" – 3:41
 "Ballad of Lucy + Ted" – 4:19
 "Moonlight Becomes You" (Johnny Burke, Jimmy Van Heusen) – 2:27

Personnel

 Phranc – producer, vocals, guitar
 Victor DeLorenzo – producer
 Connie Grauer– backing vocals, arranger, keyboards
 Jimmy Eanelli – bass guitar, 12-string guitar
 Brian Ritchie – mandolin
 Kim Zick – percussion, drums
 Scott Leonard – engineer

Release details

External links
 Amazon.com review
 Artist Direct review
 HR Music review
 Rate Your Music review

I Enjoy Being a Girl
I Enjoy Being a Girl
I Enjoy Being a Girl